Pultenaea rosmarinifolia, commonly known as rosemary bush-pea, is a species of flowering plant in the family Fabaceae and is endemic to eastern New South Wales. It is an erect shrub with linear to elliptic leaves with the narrower end towards the base, and yellow and red to purplish flowers.

Description
The edges of the leaves curve downwards or are rolled under and there is a short, often down-curved point on the tip.

Taxonomy
Pultenaea rosmarinifolia was first formally described in 1833 by John Lindley in Edwards's Botanical Register from specimens raised in Clapton Nursery in London from seed collected by "Mr. Baxter" on the south coast of "New Holland". The specific epithet (rosmarinifolia) means "Rosmarinus-leaved".

Distribution and habitat
This species of Pultenaea grows in heathland and forest on the coast and nearby ranges of New South Wales, from near Newcastle to Bawley Point.

References

Fabales of Australia
Flora of New South Wales
rosmarinifolia
Plants described in 1833
Taxa named by John Lindley